Trakter (Greek: Τράκτερ; English: Tractor) is the 18th studio album by Greek singer-songwriter and record producer Nikos Karvelas, released by Music Box International's Pan-Vox label in December 2007. The album peaked at number 40 on the Greek Albums Chart.

Track listing

External links 
 Official site

2007 albums
Albums produced by Nikos Karvelas
Greek-language albums
Nikos Karvelas albums